Coalition for the Europe of the Peoples (CEP; , HEA) was a Spanish electoral list in the European Parliament election in 1987 made up from regionalist parties.

Composition

Electoral performance

European Parliament

References

Defunct political party alliances in Spain
Regionalist parties in Spain